Post Mortem is a 1999 Canadian drama film directed by Louis Bélanger. The film won two Genie Awards, including Best Actress for Moreau.

Cast 
 Gabriel Arcand - Ghislain O'Brien
 Sylvie Moreau - Linda Faucher
 Hélène Loiselle - Madame Faucher
 Sarah Lecomte-Bergeron - Charlotte Faucher
 Ghislain Taschereau - Marc
 Pierre Collin - Lieutenant Bélanger

Accolades

References

External links 

Post Mortem at Films du Québec 
Post Mortem at Cinoche.com 

1999 films
1999 drama films
Canadian drama films
Best First Feature Genie and Canadian Screen Award-winning films
Films directed by Louis Bélanger
1999 directorial debut films
Best Film Prix Iris winners
French-language Canadian films
1990s Canadian films